St. Albans Site is a historic archaeological site located near St. Albans, Kanawha County, West Virginia.  It was a camping site for prehistoric peoples between c. 12,000 B.C. and A.D. 1700.  Excavations in 1964–1965, yielded projectile points ranging in age from 7900 t o 6210 B.C.

It was listed on the National Register of Historic Places in 1974.

References

Archaeological sites on the National Register of Historic Places in West Virginia
National Register of Historic Places in Kanawha County, West Virginia
St. Albans, West Virginia